The board game of Go was created in East Asia, and is still dominated by Japan, Korea and China.  However, since the late 1900s several high-level players have grown and become active in Europe.
Some of them are players from Asia who came to promote the game of go in Europe.
Mainly, though, the players were born in Europe, sometimes with strong support from Asian Go professionals, and a few of the Europeans have themselves become professional players.

In general, every country in Europe has its own national federation or association, which is affiliated to the European Go Federation (EGF), and each national body manages the activities linked to the game of go in their own country.
The activities are almost exclusively undertaken by volunteers.

Players by country

Austria

Best players 
 Manfred Wimmer – 1-dan professional player – 2-time European Go Championship winner .
 Helmut Hasibeder – Previous European Champion.

Czech Republic

Best players 
 Lukáš Podpěra, 7d
 Vladimír Daněk, 6d
 Jan Šimara, 6d
 Jan Prokop, 6d
Radek Nechanický, 6d

Finland

Best players 
 Antti Törmänen – 1-dan professional player

France

Best players

Germany

Best players

Hungary

Best players

Netherlands

Best players 
 Guo Juan – 4-time European Champion .
 Rob Van Zeijst – 3-time European Champion (including youngest European Champion at the age of 19).
 Ronald Schlemper – 2-time European Champion.

Romania

Best players

Russia 

 Alexander Dinerchtein 3p
 Svetlana Shikshina 3p
 Ilya Shikshin 2p

Slovakia 
 Pavol Lisy 2p – European Champion 2018, 5-time Slovak champion (2010, 2011, 2012, 2013, 2014), winner of first European Professional Qualification tournament in 2014 and thereby first European Go Professional

Ukraine 

 Artem Kachanovskyi 2p
 Andrii Kravets 1p
 Mariya Zakharchenko 1p

United Kingdom

Best players 
 Matthew Macfadyen – 5-time European Champion.

Israel

Best players 
 Ali Jabarin – 2-dan professional player – The 2nd European professional, 5-time Israeli Go Champion and winner of the 2009 European Youth Go Championship.

See also 
 European Go Championship
 European Youth Go Championship
 European Pair Go Championship
 European Go Federation
 Female Go players

References

External links